Harcourt is a closed station located on the Bendigo line. It served the township of Harcourt and was closed to passenger traffic on 4 October 1981, as part of the New Deal timetable for country passengers.

A 10-ton crane at the station was abolished in 1973.

The station building on the former down platform housed the studios of Goldfields Community Access Radio (3CCC) from 1982 to 2006.

In August 2018, the state government announced that it intended to re-open the station if it was re-elected at the 2018 state election.

References

Disused railway stations in Victoria (Australia)